Sazaa may refer to:

 Sazaa (1951 film), an Indian film
 Sazaa (1972 film), an Indian thriller film
 Sazaa (2011 film), a Maldivian romantic drama film